The 2012 ITF Men's Circuit is the 2012 edition of the third tier tour for men's professional tennis. It is organised by the International Tennis Federation and is a tier below the ATP Challenger Tour.

October

November

December

See also 
2012 ITF Men's Circuit
2012 ITF Men's Circuit (January–March)
2012 ITF Men's Circuit (April–June)
2012 ITF Men's Circuit (July–September)
2012 ATP World Tour
2012 ATP Challenger Tour

References 

ITF Men's Circuit 4